Gifty Assifuah (born 23 July 2000) is a Ghanaian professional footballer, who plays as a forward for 1207 Antalya Spor in the Turkish Women's Football Super League.

Private life 
Gifty Assifuah was born in Accra, Ghana. Her birth date was cofficially hanged from 23 July 1998 to the same day in 2000 with effect from 5 July 2017.

Club career 
Assifuah was inspired by her brother Ebenezer, a successful national footballer. She admits that she learned and picked up tricks from him.

Being a forward, she played for Sekondi Hasaacas (2018–2019), Halifax Ladies  (2019–2020) and Hasaacas Ladies (2020–2021) in her country.

In 2021, she moved to Turkey and joined 1207 Antalya Spor to play in the Turkish Women's Football Super League She scored her team's the only goal in the additional time, her team's first goal in the 2021-22 league season's first and winning match.

References 

2000 births
Living people
Footballers from Accra
Ghanaian women's footballers
Women's association football forwards
Ghanaian expatriate women's footballers
Ghanaian expatriate sportspeople in Turkey
Expatriate women's footballers in Turkey
Turkish Women's Football Super League players
1207 Antalya Spor players